Julia – Wege zum Glück is a German television series. After Chapter 250 the title was changed into Wege zum Glück.

See also
List of German television series

External links
 

2005 German television series debuts
2009 German television series endings
German-language television shows
ZDF original programming

de:Julia – Wege zum Glück